Duncan Penwarden (born William Duncan Penwarden; February 9, 1880 – September 13, 1930) was a Canadian-American film and stage actor.

Penwarden was born in Mabou, British Nova Scotia, the eldest of seven siblings raised by English immigrants, Robert and Eva Penwarden. His father worked as a caretaker at a local newspaper office in Winnipeg where Duncan Pendwarden was raised before coming to America in his early twenties. Several years before his death, Penwarden applied to become a United States citizen, becoming a naturalized U.S. citizen in 1927. He died in 1930, and was survived by his Michigan-born wife, Gertrude, and their two sons.

Filmography
Laughter (1930)
The Lady Lies (1929)
Gentlemen of the Press (1929)
The Bishop's Candlesticks (1929)
The Woman God Sent (1920)
 The Imp (1919)

Broadway roles
Broken Dishes (November 5, 1929 – April 1930)
Now-a-Days (August 5, 1929 – August 1929)
Gentlemen of the Press (August 27, 1928 – December 1928)
The Clutching Claw (February 14, 1928 – March 1928)
Scalawag (March 29, 1927 – April 1927)
The Scarlet Lily (January 29, 1927 – March 1927)
Is Zat So? (January 5, 1925 – July 1926)

Death
He died, aged 50, at his home in Jackson Heights, Queens from pneumonia, in 1930, several weeks after surgery.

References

External links

1880 births
1930 deaths
American male film actors
American male silent film actors
20th-century American male actors
American male stage actors
American people of English descent
Canadian male film actors
Canadian male silent film actors
Canadian male stage actors
Canadian people of English descent
Canadian emigrants to the United States
Deaths from pneumonia in New York City
Male actors from Nova Scotia
20th-century Canadian male actors